Boreotrophon clathratus, common name the clathrate trophon, is a species of sea snail, a marine gastropod mollusk in the family Muricidae, the murex snails or rock snails.

Description 

The height of the shell varies between 12 mm and 97 mm. The fusiform shell has fourteen ribs. The whorls have numerous sharp, laminated varices. The canal is open and turned to the left. There is no umbilicus. The thin lip is smooth within.

Distribution 

This species has a wide, usually boreal distribution. It occurs in European waters, the Baltic Sea, the Beaufort Sea, in the Northwest Atlantic Ocean, in the Bering Strait, in the Yellow Sea, in the Pacific Ocean.

References

Further reading
 Ziegelmeier, E. (1966). Die Schnecken (Gastropoda Prosobranchia) der deutsche Meeresgebiete und brackigen Küstengewässer [The Gastropoda Prosobranchia from the German seas and brackish coastal waters]. Helgol. Wiss. Meeresunters. 13: 1-66
 Gosner, K.L. 1971. Guide to identification of marine and estuarine invertebrates: Cape Hatteras to the Bay of Fundy. John Wiley & Sons, Inc. 693 p.
 Linkletter, L.E. 1977. A checklist of marine fauna and flora of the Bay of Fundy. Huntsman Marine Laboratory, St. Andrews, N.B. 68 p
 Backeljau, T. (1986). Lijst van de recente mariene mollusken van België [List of the recent marine molluscs of Belgium]. Koninklijk Belgisch Instituut voor Natuurwetenschappen: Brussels, Belgium. 106 pp
 Turgeon, D.D., et al. 1998. Common and scientific names of aquatic invertebrates of the United States and Canada. American Fisheries Society Special Publication 26
 de Kluijver, M.J.; Ingalsuo, S.S.; de Bruyne, R.H. (2000). Macrobenthos of the North Sea [CD-ROM]: 1. Keys to Mollusca and Brachiopoda. World Biodiversity Database CD-ROM Series. Expert Center for Taxonomic Identification (ETI): Amsterdam, The Netherlands. . 1 cd-rom pp
 Gofas, S.; Le Renard, J.; Bouchet, P. (2001). Mollusca, in: Costello, M.J. et al. (Ed.) (2001). European register of marine species: a check-list of the marine species in Europe and a bibliography of guides to their identification. Collection Patrimoines Naturels, 50: pp. 180–213
 Trott, T.J. 2004. Cobscook Bay inventory: a historical checklist of marine invertebrates spanning 162 years. Northeastern Naturalist (Special Issue 2): 261–324
 Muller, Y. (2004). Faune et flore du littoral du Nord, du Pas-de-Calais et de la Belgique: inventaire. [Coastal fauna and flora of the Nord, Pas-de-Calais and Belgium: inventory]. Commission Régionale de Biologie Région Nord Pas-de-Calais: France. 307 pp.
 Yakovis E. & Artemieva A. (2015). "Bored to Death: Community-Wide Effect of Predation on a Foundation Species in a Low-Disturbance Arctic Subtidal System". PLoS ONE 10(7): e0132973.

External links

Boreotrophon
Gastropods described in 1767
Taxa named by Carl Linnaeus